The 2017 Red Bull Air Race of San Diego was the second round of the 2017 Red Bull Air Race World Championship, the twelfth season of the Red Bull Air Race World Championship. 
The event was held in San Diego, California - the city of the United States.

Master Class

Qualification

Round of 14

Round of 8

Final 4

Challenger Class

Results

  Pilon Hit
  Pilon Hit

Standings after the event

Master Class standings

Challenger Class standings

References

External links

|- style="text-align:center"
|width="35%"|Previous race:2017 Red Bull Air Race of Abu Dhabi
|width="30%"|Red Bull Air Race2017 season
|width="35%"|Next race:2017 Red Bull Air Race of Chiba
|- style="text-align:center"
|width="35%"|Previous race:2009 Red Bull Air Race of San Diego
|width="30%"|Red Bull Air Race of San Diego
|width="35%"|Next race:none
|- style="text-align:center"

San Diego
Motorsport competitions in California
Red Bull Air Race, San Diego
Red Bull Air Race, San Diego